Saceruela is a municipality in Ciudad Real, Castile-La Mancha, Spain.

Municipalities in the Province of Ciudad Real